The 2009 Mr. Olympia contest 
was an IFBB professional bodybuilding competition and the feature event of Joe Weider's Olympia Fitness & Performance Weekend 2009 held September 24–27, 2009 at the Orleans Arena in Las Vegas, Nevada.
Other events at the exhibition included the 202 Olympia Showdown, 
Ms. Olympia, Fitness Olympia, and Figure Olympia contests.

Results

Notable events
Jay Cutler became the first bodybuilder in Mr. Olympia history to reclaim his title after losing to Dexter Jackson in 2008.
Dexter Jackson, defending his 2008 championship, came in 3rd losing by one point to a vastly improved Branch Warren

See also
 2009 Ms. Olympia

References

External links 
 Mr. Olympia

 2009
Mr. Olympia
Mr. Olympia 2009
2009 in bodybuilding
Mr. Olympia 2009